Scaleby is a historic estate home and farm located near Boyce, Clarke County, Virginia. The main house and associated outbuildings were built between February 1909 and December 1911 for Henry Brook and Hattie Newcomer Gilpin. The  house was named for the wealthy family's ancestral home in England.

Description
The main house is a -story, nine bay, brick dwelling in the Colonial Revival style.  It consists of a main block measuring 100 feet by 70 feet, connected to a dependency by a 36 feet long hyphen.  The front facade features a five bay front porch supported by colossal Ionic order columns. Also on the property are the contributing Gardener's Cottage, the Farm Manager's House, the stable, the garage, a barn, a double-crib barn, the tenant house, a smokehouse, a water storage facility, the pumphouse, a two-story tower-like water catchment facility, a garden pergola, an ice-well with a gazebo, a stone terrace, and a concrete-lined pond. The main house has a steel frame, with reinforced concrete floor and stair construction

Scaleby was listed on the National Register of Historic Places in 1990.

References

Houses on the National Register of Historic Places in Virginia
Farms on the National Register of Historic Places in Virginia
National Register of Historic Places in Clarke County, Virginia
Colonial Revival architecture in Virginia
Houses completed in 1911
Houses in Clarke County, Virginia